The Official Opposition Shadow Cabinet of the 39th Canadian parliament is listed below.  Members are drawn from the Liberal Party of Canada, and most are members of their parliamentary caucus. The shadow cabinet was most recently shuffled on March 31, 2008.

Liberal Caucus Critics

Opposition Shadow Cabinet Committees

Priorities & Planning
Stéphane Dion, chair
Michael Ignatieff, vice-chair
James Cowan
Ken Dryden
Martha Hall Findlay
Ralph Goodale
Céline Hervieux-Payette
Dominic LeBlanc
Keith Martin
John McKay
Massimo Pacetti
Bernard Patry
Marcel Proulx
Bob Rae
Karen Redman
Geoff Regan
Andy Scott
Claudette Tardif
Bryon Wilfert
Paul Martin, special advisor

Economic Prosperity
John McKay, chair
Massimo Pacetti, vice-chair
Gerry Byrne
Roy Cullen
Susan Kadis
Gurbax Malhi
John Maloney
Robert Thibault
Roger Valley
Tom Wappel

Social Justice
Ken Dryden, chair
Andy Scott, vice-chair
Bill Matthews
Joe McGuire
Brian Murphy
Lloyd St. Amand
Paul Szabo

Environmental Sustainability
Geoff Regan, chair
Joyce Murray, vice-chair
John Cannis
Nancy Karetak-Lindell
Anthony Rota
Francis Scarpaleggia
Brent St. Denis
Paul Steckle
Alan Tonks

Canada & the World
Bryon Wilfert, chair
Keith Martin, vice-chair
Rodger Cuzner
Jim Karygiannis
Derek Lee
Glen Pearson
Yasmin Ratansi
Andrew Telegdi
Lui Temelkovski

See also
Cabinet of Canada
Official Opposition (Canada)
Shadow Cabinet
Bloc Québécois Shadow Cabinet
New Democratic Party Shadow Cabinet

External links
Liberal Opposition Critics
The Opposition in the Canadian House of Commons: Role, Structure, and Powers | Mapleleafweb.com

Political history of Canada
39th Canadian Parliament
Canadian shadow cabinets